Venezia was the second of two  ironclad warships built for the Italian Regia Marina in the 1860s. She was armed with a main battery of eighteen  guns in a central armored casemate. Her lengthy construction time, a result of her re-design from a broadside ironclad, quickly rendered her obsolescent compared to the new turret ships that began to enter service in the 1880s. As a result, her career was limited. She became a training ship in 1881 and served until 1895. Venezia was broken up for scrap the next year.

Design

Her propulsion system consisted of one single-expansion steam engine that drove a single screw propeller, with steam supplied by six coal-fired, cylindrical fire-tube boilers that were vented through a single funnel. The ship was barque-rigged to supplement the steam engine. She had a crew of 549–551 officers and men.

Venezia was designed as a broadside ironclad, but other navies had developed the central battery ship while she was under construction, prompting the Italian Navy to re-design the ship. She was armed with a main battery of eighteen  guns placed in a central casemate. The central battery design allowed two guns to fire ahead and two to fire astern.

Service history
Venezias keel was laid down at the Cantiere della Foce shipyard in Genoa in February 1863, and her completed hull was launched on 21 January 1869. Fitting-out work was completed on 1 April 1873; the re-design work significantly delayed completion compared to her sister, which had been finished almost four years before. Despite being completed as a central battery ship, Venezia nevertheless rapidly became obsolescent, as the type was superseded by new turret ships like the  begun the same year she entered service. In addition, the Italian naval budget was drastically reduced following the defeat at Lissa in 1866, which reflected a stark decrease in the government's confidence in the fleet. As a result, she saw little use during her career.

On 23 November 1879, Venezia ran aground off Zakynthos, Greece, but she was later refloated. Venzia was converted into a torpedo training ship in 1881; her sailing rig was cut down and she was equipped with four  guns and four  guns. Her crew was significantly reduced to 302 officers and men. She served in this capacity until 23 August 1895 in La Spezia. The ship was stricken that year and had been broken up by 1896.

Notes

References

External links
 Venezia Marina Militare website 

Venezia
Ships built in Genoa
1869 ships
Maritime incidents in November 1879